Eulogio Sandoval (born 14 July 1922, date of death unknown) was a Bolivian football midfielder who played for Bolivia in the 1950 FIFA World Cup. He also played for Club Litoral. Sandoval is deceased.

References

1922 births
Year of death missing
Bolivian footballers
Bolivia international footballers
Association football midfielders
Club Deportivo Litoral (Cochabamba) players
1950 FIFA World Cup players